GS1 is a not-for-profit, international organization developing and maintaining its own standards for barcodes and the corresponding issue company prefixes. The best known of these standards is the barcode, a symbol printed on products that can be scanned electronically.

GS1 has 116 local member organizations and over 2 million user companies.

History
In 1969, the retail industry in the US was searching for a way to speed up the check-out process in shops. The Ad Hoc Committee for a Uniform Grocery Product Identification Code was established to find a solution.

In 1973, the Universal Product Code (UPC) was selected by this group as the first single standard for unique product identification. In 1974, the Uniform Code Council (UCC) was founded to administer the standard. On 26 June 1974, a pack of Wrigley’s chewing gum became the first ever  product with a barcode to be scanned in a shop.

In 1976, the original 12-digit code was expanded to 13 digits, which allowed the identification system to be used outside the U.S. In 1977, the European Article Numbering Association (EAN) was established in Brussels, with founding members from 12 countries.

In 1990, EAN and UCC signed a global cooperation agreement and expanded their overall presence to 45 countries. In 1999, EAN and UCC launched the Auto-ID Centre to develop Electronic Product Code (EPC), enabling GS1 standards to be used for RFID.

In 2004, EAN and UCC launched the Global Data Synchronization Network (GDSN), a global, internet-based initiative that enables trading partners to efficiently exchange product master data.

By 2005, the organisation was present in over 90 countries, and it started to use the name GS1 on a worldwide basis. Whilst "GS1" is not an acronym, it refers to the organisation offering one global system of standards.

In August 2018, the GS1 Web URI Structure Standard was ratified, allowing unique ID's to be added to products by storing a URI (a webpage-like address) as a QR code.

Barcodes 

Barcodes defined by GS1 standards are very common. GS1 introduced the barcode in 1974. A barcode encodes a product identification number that can be scanned electronically, making it easier for products to be tracked, processed, and stored.

Barcodes improve the efficiency, safety, speed and visibility of supply chains across physical and digital channels. They have a crucial role in the retail industry, including today's online marketplaces, moving beyond just faster checkout to improved inventory and delivery management, and the opportunity to sell online on a global scale. In the UK alone, the introduction of the barcode in the retail industry has resulted in savings of 10.5 billion pounds per year.

Some of the barcodes that GS1 developed and manages are: EAN/UPC (used mainly on consumer goods), GS1 Data Matrix (used mainly on healthcare products), GS1-128, GS1 DataBar, and GS1 QR Code.

Standards 
The most influential GS1 standard is the GTIN. It identifies products uniquely around the world and forms the base of the GS1 system.

Main GS1 standards are as follows:

  Application Level Events (ALE)
 Core Business Vocabulary (CBV)
 EAN/UPC barcodes
 EPC/RFID tags
 EPCIS
 GEPIR
 Global Data Model
 Global Data Synchronization Network (GDSN)
 Global Document Type Identifier (GDTI)
 Global Individual Asset Identifier  (GIAI)
 Global Identification Number for Consignment (GINC)
 Global Location Number (GLN)
 Global Product Classification (GPC)
 Global Returnable Asset Identifier (GRAI)
 Global Service Relationship Number (GSRN)
 Global Shipment Identification Number (GSIN)
 Global Trade Item Number (GTIN) 
 GS1-128
 GS1 DataBar
 GS1 DataMatrix
 GS1 Digital Link
 GS1 EDI
 ITF-14
 Low-Level Reader Protocol (LLRP)
 Object Name Service (ONS)
 Serial Shipping Container Code (SSCC) 

Many GS1 standards are also ISO standards, including the GTIN, GLN, and SSCC.

GS1 also acts as the secretariat for ISO's Automatic identification and data capture techniques technical committee (ISO/IEC JTC 1/SC 31).

GS1 standards are developed and maintained through the GS1 Global Standards Management Process (GSMP), a community-based forum that brings together representatives from different industries and businesses.

Industries

Retail and marketplaces 
Retail was the first industry that GS1 began working with and has remained their primary focus. Today, GS1 operates in four retail sub-sectors on a global level: Apparel, Fresh Foods, CPG and General Merchandise.

Key focus areas in retail include sustainability, data quality, compliance with regulatory requirements, traceability of products from their origin through delivery, and upstream integration between manufacturers and suppliers.

As consumers are recurring to e-commerce more often throughout the years, GS1 has developed standards that uniquely identify products for the benefit of consumers and for search engines, providing accurate and complete product information digitally.

Major e-commerce companies such as eBay, Amazon and Google Shopping require companies to use a GS1 GTIN to sell on their websites.

Healthcare 
Since 2005, GS1 has operated in Healthcare with the primary objective to enhance patient safety, and to drive supply chain efficiencies.

More than 70 countries have healthcare-related regulations or trading partner requirements where GS1 standards are being used for the above reasons as well for medicines as medical devices. Members of GS1 Healthcare include more than 140 leading healthcare organisations worldwide.

Other industries 
GS1 operates three other key industries globally: Transport & Logistics, Food service and Technical Industries. GS1's 116 Member Organisations in over 116 countries around the world collectively focus on dozens of industry sectors.

See also
 List of GS1 country codes

References

External links
 www.gs1.org

 
Standards organizations

es:EAN